Documenta11 was the eleventh edition of documenta, a quinquennial contemporary art exhibition. It was held between 8 June and 15 September 2002 in Kassel, Germany. The artistic director was Okwui Enwezor.

Participants 
 A Georges Adéagbo, Ravi Agarwal, Eija-Liisa Ahtila, Chantal Akerman, Gaston André Ancelovici (Colectivo Cine-Ojo), Fareed Armaly, Rashid Masharawi, Michael Ashkin, Asymptote Architecture, Kutlug Ataman, The Atlas Group, Walid Raad
 B Julie Bargmann & Stacy Levy, Artur Barrio, Bernd and Hilla Becher, Zarina Bhimji, Black Audio Film Collective, John Bock, Ecke Bonk, Frédéric Bruly Bouabré, Louise Bourgeois, Pavel Braila, Stanley Brouwn, Tania Bruguera
 C Luis Camnitzer, James Coleman, Constant, Margit Czenki
 D Hanne Darboven, Destiny Deacon, Stan Douglas
 E Cecilia Edefalk, William Eggleston, Maria Eichhorn, Touhami Ennadre, Cerith Wyn Evans
 F Feng Mengbo, Chohreh Feyzdjou, Yona Friedman
 G Meschac Gaba, Giuseppe Gabellone, Carlos Garaicoa, Kendell Geers, Isa Genzken, Jef Geys, David Goldblatt, Leon Golub, Dominique Gonzalez-Foerster, Renée Green, Víctor Grippo, Le Groupe Amos
 H Jens Haaning, Mona Hatoum, Thomas Hirschhorn, Candida Höfer, Craigie Horsfield, Huit Facettes: Dynamique Artistique & Culturelle, Pierre Huyghe
 I Igloolik Isuma Productions (Nunavut: Our Land), Sanja Iveković
 J Alfredo Jaar, Joan Jonas, Isaac Julien
 K Amar Kanwar, On Kawara, William Kentridge, Johan van der Keuken, Bodys Isek Kingelez, Ben Kinmont, Igor and Svetlana Kopystiansky, Ivan Kožarić, Andreja Kulunčić
 L Glenn Ligon, Ken Lum
 M Mark Manders, Fabian Marcaccio, Steve McQueen, Cildo Meireles, Jonas Mekas, Annette Messager, Ryuji Miyamoto, Santu Mofokeng, Multiplicity, Juan Muñoz
 N Shirin Neshat
 O Gabriel Orozco, Olumuyiwa Olamide Osifuye, Ulrike Ottinger
 P Park Fiction, Manfred Pernice, Raymond Pettibon, Adrian Piper, Lisl Ponger, Pere Portabella
 R RAQS Media Collective, Alejandra Riera and Doina Petrescu, Dieter Roth
 S Doris Salcedo, Seifollah Samadian, Gilles Saussier, Christoph Schäfer, Allan Sekula, Yinka Shonibare, Andreas Siekmann, Simparch, Lorna Simpson, Eyal Sivan, David Small
 T Fiona Tan, Pascale Marthine Tayou, Jean-Marie Teno, Trinh T. Minh-ha, tsunamii.net, Joëlle Tuerlinckx, Luc Tuymans
 U Urbonas, Nomeda & Gediminas
 W Jeff Wall, Nari Ward, Ouattara Watts
 Y Yang Fudong

References

External links 
 Linda Nochlin, Tom Holert and James Meyer. "Platform Muse: Documenta 11" in Artforum, September 2002. pp. 160–196.

Documenta 11
2002 in Germany
2002 in art